Jack Churchill Mitchell (December 3, 1923 – July 5, 2009) was an American football player and coach. He served as the head football coach at the Municipal University of Wichita—now known as Wichita State University—from 1953 to 1954, the University of Arkansas from 1955 to 1957, and the University of Kansas from 1958 to 1966. compiling a career college football record of 72–61–7. Mitchell played football at the University of Oklahoma as a quarterback from 1946 to 1948. He was named an All-American in 1948. After retiring from coaching, Mitchell moved to Wellington, Kansas  to become a publisher at The Wellington Daily News.

Coaching career

Wichita
Mitchell was the 21st head football coach for the Municipal University of Wichita, now Wichita State University, located in Wichita, Kansas. He held that position for two seasons, from 1953 until 1954. His overall coaching record at Wichita was 13–5–1.

Arkansas
From 1954 to 1957, Mitchell was the head football coach at University of Arkansas, where he compiled a 17–12–1 record.

Kansas
Mitchell was the 28th head football coach for the University of Kansas located in Lawrence, Kansas and he held that position for nine seasons, from 1958 until 1966. His overall coaching record at Kansas was 44–42–5.

Death
Mitchell died on July 5, 2009, in Sun City, Arizona.

Head coaching record

College

References

External links
 

1923 births
2009 deaths
20th-century American newspaper publishers (people)
American football quarterbacks
Arkansas Razorbacks football coaches
Kansas Jayhawks football coaches
Oklahoma Sooners football players
Texas Tech Red Raiders football coaches
Tulsa Golden Hurricane football coaches
Wichita State Shockers football coaches
High school football coaches in Oklahoma
People from Arkansas City, Kansas
Coaches of American football from Kansas
Players of American football from Kansas